The Zane Grey Highline Trail 50 mile Endurance Run, known commonly as the Zane Grey 50, is a 50-mile (80 km) ultramarathon that takes place on the  Highline Trail in the Tonto National Forest just below the Mogollon Rim in central Arizona. The race is typically held on the 4th Saturday in
April. The race starts at the Pine Trail head on the far west end of the Highline Trail, just south of the Town of Pine, Arizona. The race travels east and finishes at the 260 Trailhead, just east of the town of Christopher Creek. Runners climb cumulative total of over 10,000 feet (3048m) and descend a total of over 9000 feet (2743m). The actual distance is closer to 55 miles. The race begins at 5:00 AM and continues through the day with the last runners finishing around 9:00 PM.

History
The race was founded in 1990 by Pat McKenzie and was first completed by Scott Modzelewski in a time of 12 hours, 55 minutes. The course record is held by Dave Mackey in a time of 7:51:07 Set in 2004. The women’s division course record of 9:14:24 was set in 2004 by Nikki Kimball.

Results
Seventeen runners signed up for the inaugural Zane Grey 50 mile run in 1990, only 6 finished. The following year, the course was rerouted because of the Dude Fire which burned down Zane Grey’s cabin, located just off the Highline Trail. From 1993 to 1995 the race was shortened to a 50-kilometer distance. Runners had the option to run the race on one of the two days the weekend it was held. Some runners opted to run both days. In 2007, the course was run in reverse, starting at the 260 Trailhead and travelling West to Pine. The race has an average finishing rate of 71%, making it one of the most difficult 50-mile ultra marathons in the country.

References

External links 
 zanegrey50.com - Official site of the Zane Grey 50 Mile Endurance Run
 Ultra runners set for Zane Grey 50-miler to test endurance, stamina | Payson Roundup - Payson, AZ - Payson Roundup Newspaper

Ultramarathons in the United States